The 1980 Australia Day Honours were announced on 26 January 1980 by the Governor General of Australia, Sir Zelman Cowen.

The Australia Day Honours are the first of the two major annual honours lists, announced on Australia Day (26 January), with the other being the Queen's Birthday Honours which are announced on the second Monday in June.

Order of Australia

Dame of the Order of Australia (AD)

Companion of the Order of Australia (AC)

Officer of the Order of Australia (AO)

General Division

Military Division

Member of the Order of Australia (AM)

General Division

Military Division

Medal of the Order of Australia (OAM)

General Division

Military Division

References

1980 awards
Orders, decorations, and medals of Australia
1980 in Australia